Sébastien Etiemble (born 22 October 1987) is a French professional footballer who currently plays for Tanjong Pagar United in the S.League. He plays as a midfielder. In December 2016, he moved to Ayeyawady United.

Youth career
Etiemble started playing professional football at the age of 23. In his hometown, he has played in the Championnat de France amateur and Championnat de France amateur 2, for the clubs US Quevilly and AFC Compiègne respectively.

Etiemble then went on to play in the S.League with Tanjong Pagar United, and has since contributed to the club in many ways. The transfer was made possible through the French connection with manager Patrick Vallée.

References

1987 births
Living people
Footballers from Rennes
Association football midfielders
French footballers
Expatriate footballers in Singapore
Expatriate sportspeople in Singapore
French expatriate sportspeople in Singapore
French expatriate footballers
Ayeyawady United F.C. players
Singapore Premier League players